SS Empire Admiral was a 7,842 ton steamship which was built in 1945 for the Ministry of War Transport (MoWT), she was sold in 1947 becoming Peter Dal, and sold again in 1951 and renamed Benledi. In 1953 she was sold to Bahamas and renamed Andros Tommeno, being resold later that year to Liberia. In 1966 she was resold and renamed Unique Carrier, serving until 1969 when she was scrapped in Taiwan.

History
Empire Admiral was built by Vickers-Armstrongs Ltd, Barrow in Furness for the Ministry of War Transport and launched on 26 March 1945, being completed the following August. She was managed by H Hogarth & Sons initially, with management passing to A Weir & Co, London in 1946. In 1947, Empire Admiral was sold to A Weir & Co and renamed Peter Dal. On 21 October 1949, an onboard explosion killed one crew member and injured two others. Peter Dal was only slightly damaged. In 1950, Peter Dal was sold to W Thompson & Co, Edinburgh who traded as Ben Line, and was renamed Benledi. On 24 February 1950, Benledi caught fire in the Mediterranean east of Malta. The 44 crew took to the lifeboats and were rescued by the tanker . In 1953, Benledi was sold to E G Thomson Ltd, remaining within the Ben Line fleet.

In 1963, Benledi was sold to Andros Navigation Co., Nassau, Bahamas and renamed Andros Tommeno, being resold later that year to Frank Shipping Co Ltd, Liberia. In 1966, Andros Tommeno was sold to Unique Maritime Corporation, Liberia and renamed Unique Carrier, serving until 1969 when she arrived for scrapping on 27 February 1969 in Kaohsiung, Taiwan.

Official number and code letters
Official Numbers were a forerunner to IMO Numbers.

Empire Admiral had the UK Official Number 169038 and used the Code Letters GFJQ.

References

External links
Photo of SS Empire Admiral
Photo of SS Benledi

1945 ships
Ships built in Barrow-in-Furness
Steamships of the United Kingdom
Empire ships
Ministry of War Transport ships
Maritime incidents in 1950
Steamships of the Bahamas
Merchant ships of the Bahamas
Steamships of Liberia
Merchant ships of Liberia